John Oluf Evjen (December 13, 1874 – January 4, 1942) was an American author, Lutheran church historian and professor of theology.

Biography
John Evjen was born in Ishpeming, Michigan. He was educated at Augsburg Seminary (class of 1895) and the Theological Institute of Augsberg Seminary (1898). He earned his doctorate in Germany at the University of Leipzig (Ph.D., 1903). Evjen was an ordained minister in the Lutheran Free Church. He served as a Lutheran minister in Muskegon and Grand Rapids, Michigan.

He was acting professor of church history at the United Church Theological Seminary in St. Paul, Minnesota from 1903 until 1905.   He was a professor of biblical History in Pennsylvania College in Gettysburg, Pennsylvania from 1905 until 1909. Starting in 1909, he became a professor of theology at Augsburg Seminary in Minneapolis, MN.

Evjen was also the author of numerous books frequently addressing issues of Lutheran church theology and providing biographies of church theologians. Evjen is most frequently associated with his 1916 volume Scandinavian Immigrants in New York, 1630-1674. This epic work is a reference book frequently used by historians tracing the early immigration of German and Scandinavians to North America. It contains a collection of biographies based on ship passenger lists, parish records, church records, court records, and legal documents. Included is information such as dates of birth, places of origin, marriages, names of children, types of occupation, and references to sources.

Selected bibliography
Scandinavia and the Book of Concord (1906)
En boganmeldelse (1910)
Lutheran Germany and the Book of Concord (1911)
Scandinavian Immigrants in New York 1630-1674; With appendices on Scandinavians in Mexico and South America, 1532–1640, Scandinavians in Canada, 1619–1620, German immigrants in New York, 1630-1674 (1916)
Luther and the Reformation (1916)
Dr. Rudolph Sohm: Jurist and Church Historian (1935)
The Life of J.H.W. Stuckenberg,: Theologian, Philosopher, Sociologist, Friend of Humanity(1938)

References

External links
 John Oluf Evjen (New Schaff-Herzog Encyclopedia of Religious Knowledge)
Scandinavia (Barnette's Family Tree Book Company)
En boganmeldelse / af John O. Evjen

1874 births
1942 deaths
People from Ishpeming, Michigan
Augsburg University alumni
American people of Norwegian descent
American Lutherans